Palpita metallata is a moth in the family Crambidae. It is found in Cameroon, Mayotte, Democratic Republic of Congo (Bas Congo, East Kasai, Orientale), Ghana, Kenya, Nigeria, Sierra Leone, South Africa, Tanzania and Uganda.

The larvae feed on Funtumia species.

References

Moths described in 1781
Palpita
Moths of Africa